Seán Allis Treacy (14 February 1895 – 14 October 1920) was one of the leaders of the Third Tipperary Brigade of the IRA during the Irish War of Independence. He was one of a small group whose actions initiated that conflict in 1919. He was killed in October 1920, on Talbot Street in Dublin, in a shootout with British troops during an aborted British Secret Service surveillance operation.

Although sometimes written as Tracey, as inscribed on the commemorative plaque in Talbot Street, or even as Tracy, his surname is more usually spelt 'Treacy'.

Early life and Irish Republicanism
Born as John Treacy, Seán Allis Treacy came from a small-farming background in Soloheadbeg in west Tipperary and grew up in Hollyford. He was the son of farmer Denis Treacy and Bridget Allis.
 
He left school aged 14 and worked as a farmer, also developing deep patriotic convictions; locally, he was seen as a promising farmer, calm, direct, ready to experiment with new methods, and intelligent. He was a member of the Gaelic League, and of the Irish Republican Brotherhood (IRB) from 1911 and the Irish Volunteers from 1913.

He was picked up in the mass arrests in the aftermath of the Easter Rising in 1916 and spent much of the following two years in prisons (Cork Prison, Dundalk Gaol and Mountjoy Prison), where he joined the ongoing hunger strike (22 September 1917). Treacy was released from Mountjoy in June 1918. 

From Dundalk jail in 1918 he wrote to his comrades in Tipperary: "Deport all in favour of the enemy out of the country. Deal sternly with those who try to resist. Maintain the strictest discipline, there must be no running to kiss mothers goodbye."

In 1918 he was appointed Vice Officer-Commanding of the 3rd Tipperary Brigade of the Irish Volunteers (which became the Irish Republican Army in 1919).

Soloheadbeg ambush
On 21 January 1919 Treacy and Dan Breen, together with Seán Hogan, Séumas Robinson (known as the 'big four’) and five other volunteers, helped to ignite the conflict that was to become the Irish War of Independence. They ambushed and shot dead two members of the Royal Irish Constabulary (RIC) — Constables Patrick O'Connell and James McDonnell – during the Soloheadbeg ambush near Treacy's home. Treacy led the planning for the ambush and briefed the brigade's O/C Robinson on his return from prison in late 1918. Robinson supported the plans and agreed they wouldn't go to GHQ for permission to undertake the attack. The RIC men were guarding a transport of gelignite explosives. Some accounts say the Volunteers shot them dead when they refused to surrender and offered resistance; other accounts suggest that shooting them was the intent from the start.

Breen later recalled: 
...we took the action deliberately, having thought over the matter and talked it over between us. Treacy had stated to me that the only way of starting a war was to kill someone, and we wanted to start a war, so we intended to kill some of the police, whom we looked upon as the foremost and most important branch of the enemy forces... The only regret that we had following the ambush was that there were only two policemen in it, instead of the six we had expected...

Knocklong train rescue
As a result of the action, South Tipperary was placed under martial law and declared a Special Military Area under the Defence of the Realm Act. After another member of the Soloheadbeg ambush party, Seán Hogan, who was just 17, was arrested on 12 May 1919, the three others (Treacy, Breen and Robinson) were joined by five men from the IRA's East Limerick Brigade to organise Hogan's rescue.

Hogan was brought to the train which was intended to bring him from Thurles to Cork city on 13 May 1919 — his escort grinning at him as he told the ticketmaster: "Give me three tickets to Cork — and two returns." As the train steamed across the Tipperary border and into Co Limerick the IRA party, led by Treacy, boarded it at Knocklong. A close-range struggle ensued on the train. Treacy and Breen were seriously wounded in the gunfight. Two RIC men died, but Hogan was rescued. His rescuers rushed him into the village of Knocklong, where a butcher's wife slammed down the shutters to hide them and her husband cut off Hogan's handcuffs using a cleaver.

Dublin and the Squad
A search for Treacy and others was mounted across Ireland. Treacy left Tipperary for Dublin to avoid capture. Michael Collins employed him on assassination operations with "the Squad". He was involved in the attempted killing of the Lord Lieutenant of Ireland, Sir John French, in December 1919.

In the summer of 1920, Treacy returned to Tipperary and organised several attacks on RIC barracks, notably at Hollyford, Kilmallock and Drangan, before again moving his base of operations to Dublin.

By spring 1920 the political police of the Crimes Special Branch and G-Division (Special Branch) of the Dublin Metropolitan Police (DMP) had been effectively neutralised by IRA counterintelligence operatives under Collins. The British thoroughly reorganised their administration at Dublin Castle, including the appointment of Colonel Ormonde Winter as chief of a new Combined Intelligence Service (CIS) for Ireland. Working closely with Sir Basil Thomson, Director of Civil Intelligence in the British Home Office, with Colonel Hill Dillon, Chief of British Military Intelligence in Ireland, and with the local British Secret Service Head of Station, "Count Sevigné" at Dublin Castle, Winter began to import dozens of professional secret service agents from all parts of the British Empire into Ireland to track down IRA volunteers and Sinn Féin leaders.

Treacy and Breen were again relocated to Dublin, in the "Squad". Its mission was to discover and assassinate British secret agents, political policemen and their informants, and to carry out other special missions for GHQ. With help from police inspectors brought up to Dublin from Tipperary, CIS spotted Treacy and Breen and placed them under surveillance.

Death

On 11 October 1920, Treacy and Breen were holed up in a safe house owned by a professor and IRA sympathiser named John Carolan – Fernside – in Drumcondra on the north side of Dublin city when it was raided by a police unit, led there by a tout, Robert Pike. In the ensuing shootout, two Royal Field Artillery officers, Major Smyth and Captain White, were wounded and died the next day, while Breen was seriously wounded. Carolan, who worked at the nearby St Patrick's Teacher Training College, was shot in the neck during the crossfire which occurred during the shootout. Treacy and Breen managed to escape through a window and shot their way through the police cordon. The injured Breen was spirited away to Dublin's Mater Hospital where he was admitted using a false name. Treacy had been wounded but not seriously.

The British began to search for the two and Collins ordered the Squad to guard them while plans were laid for Treacy to be exfiltrated from the Dublin metropolitan area. Treacy hoped to return to Tipperary. Realising that the major thoroughfares would be under surveillance, he bought a bicycle with the intention of cycling home by back roads.  When Collins learned that a public funeral for the two officers killed at Fernside was to take place on 14 October, he ordered the Squad to set up along the procession route and to take out two powerful men, the Chief Secretary for Ireland Hamar Greenwood and Lieutenant-General Henry Hugh Tudor, who had established the Black and Tans.

Several members of the Squad assembled at a Dublin safe house, the Republican Outfitters shop at 94 Talbot Street early on 14 October in preparation for this operation. Treacy was to join them for his own protection, but arrived late, to discover that Collins had cancelled the attack. Treacy was extremely distressed — he and his closest friend, Dan Breen, each thought that the other had been killed. Breen had managed to get away, his feet cut to ribbons by the glass of Professor Carolan's greenhouse, and was now being hidden by the medical staff in a nearby hospital.

While the others quietly dispersed, Treacy lingered behind in the shop. But he had been followed by an informer, and a British Secret Service surveillance team led by Major Carew and Lt Gilbert Price was stalking him in the hope that he would lead them to Collins or to other high-value IRA targets.

Treacy realised that he was being followed, and ran for his bicycle. But he grabbed the wrong bike — taking a machine far too big for him — and fell. Price drew his pistol and closed in. Treacy drew his parabellum automatic pistol and shot Price and another British agent before he was hit in the head, dying instantly. Rushing to the scene, Winter was horrified to see the bodies of Treacy and his own agents lying dead in Talbot Street.

The entire confrontation had been witnessed by a 15-year-old Dublin trainee photographer, John J. Horgan, who captured the scene moments after the shooting, showing Treacy lying dead on the pavement and Price propped up against a doorway a few feet away. Making a statement to a reporter, Winter called the event "a tragedy".

British forces immediately attacked the Republican Outfitters shop, riddling the shop with bullets and throwing Mills Bombs inside to wreck it.

Legacy

Treacy's death sent alarm bells through the upper echelons of the IRA leadership.

A commemorative plaque above the door of 94 Talbot Street, now the Wooden Whisk and directly across from Talbot House, commemorates the spot where Treacy died. His coffin arrived by train at Limerick Junction station and was accompanied to St Nicholas Church, Solohead by an immense crowd of Tipperary people. He was buried at Kilfeacle graveyard, where, despite a large presence of British military personnel, a volley of shots was fired over the grave.

Treacy is remembered each year on the anniversary of his death at a commemoration ceremony in Kilfeacle. At noon on the day of any All-Ireland Senior Hurling Final in which Tipperary participate, a ceremony of remembrance is held at the spot in Talbot Street, Dublin where he died, attended mainly by people from West Tipperary and Dublin people of Tipperary extraction. The most recent ceremonies were held at on Sunday 4 September 2016 and 18 August 2019, each attracting a large attendance of Tipperary folk en route to Croke Park. The ceremony usually consists of the reading of the Proclamation of the Irish Republic, a recitation of a decade of the rosary in Irish, singing of 'Tipperary so far away', an oration by one of the organising party and the playing of the Irish National Anthem. The first event took place in 1922 and has been held on almost 30 occasions.

In Thurles, Co Tipperary Seán Treacy Avenue is named after him. The town of Tipperary is home to the Seán Treacy Memorial Swimming Pool, which contains many historic items related to the Easter Rising and the War of Independence, and a copy of the Proclamation of the Irish Republic. The Seán Treacy GAA Club takes his name in honour and represents the parish of Hollyford, Kilcommon and Rearcross in the Slieve Felim Hills, which straddle the borderland between the historical North and South Ridings of Tipperary. He is remembered in many songs. The song Seán Treacy, also called Tipperary so Far Away, is about Treacy's death and is still sung with pride in west Tipperary. A line from this song was quoted by former US president Ronald Reagan when he visited Tipperary in 1984: "And I'll never more roam, from my own native home, in Tipperary so far away".

The song most closely identified with him, Seán Treacy and Dan Breen commemorates his and Breen's escape from Fernside, and mourns his death:
Give me a Parabellum and a bandolier of shells,
Take me to the Murder Gang and I'll blow them all to hell,
For just today, I heard them say that Treacy met defeat,
Our lovely Séan is dead and gone, shot down in Talbot Street.

They were at the front and at the back; they were all around the place. None of them anxious to attack; or meet him face to face. Lloyd George did say, "You'll get your pay - and a holiday most complete", But none of them knew what they would go through, in that house in Talbot Street.

When he saw them in their Crossley trucks, like the fox inside his lair, Seán waited for to size them up before he did emerge,
With blazing guns he met the Huns, and forced them to retreat,
He shot them in pairs coming down the stairs, in that house in Talbot Street.

"Come on", he cried, "'Come show your hand, you have boasted for so long, How you would crush this rebel band with your armies great and strong". "No surrender", was his war cry, "Fight on lads, no retreat" Brave Treacy cried before he died, shot down in Talbot Street.

Footnotes and References

Bibliography

External links
Republican Autograph Book – Seán Treacy at www.clarelibrary.ie
AN PHOBLACHT/REPUBLICAN NEWS at republican-news.org

Sean Treacy & Talbot street  
Lyrics and chords to Tipperary so far away

1895 births
1920 deaths
Irish Republican Army (1919–1922) members
Members of the Irish Republican Brotherhood
People from County Tipperary
Irish Republicans killed during the Irish War of Independence
People killed in United Kingdom intelligence operations